This is a list of sheep milk cheeses. Sheep milk cheese is prepared from sheep milk (or ewe's milk), the milk of domestic sheep. The milk is commonly used to make cultured dairy products, such as cheese.

Sheep milk cheeses

 Abbaye de Belloc 
 Abertam cheese 
 Anari cheese 
 Anthotyros 
 Basco-béarnaise 
 Beenleigh Blue cheese 
 Beyaz peynir 
 Brânză de burduf 
 Brocciu 
 Bryndza 
 Bryndza Podhalańska 
 Bundz 
 Cabrales cheese 
 Caciocavallo 
 Caciotta 
 Caș 
 Casciotta d'Urbino 
 Castelo Branco cheese 
 Casu marzu
 Cazelle de Saint Affrique 
 Cherni Vit 
 Corleggy Cheese 
 Croglin 
 Crozier Blue
 Dolaz cheese 
 Duddleswell cheese 
 Etorki 
 Feta 
 Fine Fettle Yorkshire   
 Ġbejna 
 Graviera 
 Halloumi 
 Idiazabal cheese 
 Jibneh Arabieh 
 Kadchgall 
 Kars gravyer cheese 
 Kashkaval 
 Kasseri 
 Kefalograviera 
 Kefalotyri 
 La Serena cheese 
 Lanark Blue 
 Lavaş cheese 
 Lighvan cheese 
 Manchego 
 Manouri 
 Mihaliç Peyniri 
 Mizithra 
 Nabulsi cheese 
 Oscypek 
 Ossau-Iraty 
 Oštiepok 
 P'tit Basque 
 Paddraccio 
 Pag cheese 
 Parlick Fell cheese 
 Pata de mulo cheese
 Pecorino 
 Pecorino di Carmasciano 
 Pecorino Romano 
 Pecorino Sardo 
 Pecorino Siciliano 
 Pecorino Toscano 
 Pepato 
 Picón Bejes-Tresviso 
 Ricotta 
 Robiola 
 Roncal cheese 
 Roquefort 
 Saloio 
 Šar cheese 
 Serra da Estrela cheese
 Serpa cheese 
 Sirene 
 St James
 Sussex Slipcote 
 Telemea 
 Testouri 
 Torta del Casar 
 Tzfat cheese 
 Van herbed cheese 
 Vlašić cheese
 Wensleydale cheese (though most Wensleydale cheese is made from cow's milk) 
  Wigmore 
 Xynomizithra 
 Xynotyro 
 Zamorano cheese

See also

 List of cheeses
 List of cheese dishes
 List of dairy products
 List of goat milk cheeses

References

External links
 

 
Sheep milk cheeses